The Valley View School, at 8465 County Road 140 about  west of Salida, Colorado was built in 1903.  It was listed on the National Register of Historic Places in 2003.

It is a rural one-story wood frame schoolhouse built in part by the Works Progress Administration.

It has a south-facing  clapboarded main section and a  concrete block addition.  The addition was built by the Works Progress Administration in 1936.

Two privies are additional contributing buildings in the listing.

References

Schools in Colorado
National Register of Historic Places in Chaffee County, Colorado
School buildings completed in 1903
School buildings on the National Register of Historic Places in Colorado